Argunovskaya is a rural locality (a village) in Argunovskoye Rural Settlement of Velsky District, Arkhangelsk Oblast, Russia. The population was 133 as of 2014. There are 2 streets.

Geography 
Argunovskaya is located on the Vaga River, 7 km east of Velsk (the district's administrative centre) by road. Argunovsky is the nearest rural locality.

References 

Rural localities in Velsky District